Russell Thorson (October 14, 1906 – July 6, 1982 )  was an American actor, perhaps best known for his co-starring role as Det. Lt. Otto Lindstrom in ABC's 1959–1962 hit crime drama, The Detectives Starring Robert Taylor.

Background 
Thorson was born in Eau Claire, Wisconsin, and his family moved to Montana when he was 12 years old. In 1930, Thorson graduated with a degree in journalism from the University of Montana in Missoula, Montana.

Career 
In the early 1940s, Thorson played Charles Meredith in Midstream on radio, replacing Hugh Studebaker when Studebaker had health problems. He starred in a later version (1949–1952) of the radio series, I Love a Mystery, as Jack Packard, alongside Jim Boles as Doc and Tony Randall as Reggy. His other radio parts included the title roles in The Tom Mix Ralston Straightshooters and Dr. Paul and Bart Friday in Adventures by Morse. He was also a member of the cast of Family Skeleton. In 1955, he began portraying Paul Barbour on the radio version of One Man's Family after having had the same role in the TV version of the program.

Thorson had small roles for film and television in Double Dynamite (1951), with Jane Russell, Groucho Marx and Frank Sinatra, Dangerous Mission (1954). He has also appeared in several classic movies, including  Johnny Concho (1956), 36 Hours (1965), The Stalking Moon (1968), and Walking Tall (1973).

Most of his career was spent on television. He is best remembered for playing the role of Det. Lt. Otto Lindstrom in The Detectives from 1959 to 1961.  He made four guest appearances on CBS's Perry Mason, including three episodes during the first two seasons from 1958 to 1959.

He appeared in guest-starring roles in such television series as  Maverick (as the stalwart Marshal Walt Hardie in a James Garner episode titled "Day of Reckoning"), Gilligan's Island, Tales of Wells Fargo, Trackdown, Wagon Train, Gunsmoke (as Mr. Brady in “Chester’s Mail Order Bride” - 1956), Lassie, Peyton Place, and The Virginian, and is also known for his role as a ship captain in "Cocoon", the pilot episode of CBS's original Hawaii Five-O with Jack Lord.

Filmography

References

Other sources 
Harmon, Jim  (2003) Radio Mystery and Adventure and Its Appearances in Film, Television and Other Media  (McFarland & Company)

External links 

 Classic Television Archive: Quinn Martin's Tales of the Unexpected (1977)

1906 births
1982 deaths
American male film actors
American male television actors
American male radio actors
People from Eau Claire, Wisconsin
Male actors from Los Angeles
20th-century American male actors
University of Montana alumni